Casandra Brené Brown (born November 18, 1965) is an American professor, lecturer, author, and podcast host. Brown is known in particular for her research on shame, vulnerability, and leadership, and for her widely viewed TEDx talk in 2010. Since then she has written six number-one New York Times bestselling books, hosts two podcasts, and has filmed a lecture for Netflix as well as a series about her latest book, Atlas of the Heart on HBO Max.

Brown holds the Huffington Foundation's Brené Brown Endowed Chair at the University of Houston's Graduate College of Social Work and is a visiting professor in management at McCombs School of Business at the University of Texas at Austin.

Early life and education
Brown was born on November 18, 1965, in San Antonio, Texas, where her parents Charles Arthur Brown and Casandra Deanne Rogers had her baptized in the Episcopal Church. She is the eldest of four children. Her family then moved to New Orleans.

Brown completed a Bachelor of Social Work degree at the University of Texas at Austin in 1995, followed by a Master of Social Work degree in 1996, and a Doctor of Philosophy degree in social work at the University of Houston in 2002.

Career

Research and teaching 
Brown has studied the topics of courage, vulnerability, shame, empathy, and leadership, which she has used to look at human connection and how it works. She has spent her research career as a professor at her alma mater, the University of Houston's Graduate College of Social Work.

Public speaking 
Brown's TEDx talk from Houston in 2010, "The Power of Vulnerability", is one of the five most viewed TED talks. Its popularity shifted her work from relative obscurity in academia into the mainstream spotlight. The talk "summarizes a decade of Brown's research on shame, framing her weightiest discoveries in self-deprecating and personal terms." Reggie Ugwu for The New York Times said that this event gave the world "a new star of social psychology."  She went on to follow this popular TED talk with another titled "Listening to Shame" in 2012. In the second talk she talks about how her life has changed since the first talk and explains the connection between shame and vulnerability, building on the thesis of her first TED talk.

She also has a less well-known talk from 2010 given at TEDxKC titled "The Price of Invulnerability." In it she explains that when numbing hard and difficult feelings, essentially feeling vulnerable, we also numb positive emotions, like joy. This led to the creation of her filmed lecture, Brené Brown: The Call to Courage, which debuted on Netflix in 2019. USA Today called it "a mix of a motivational speech and stand-up comedy special." Brown discusses how and why to choose courage over comfort, equating being brave to being vulnerable. According to her research, doing this opens people to love, joy, and belonging by allowing them to better know themselves and more deeply connect with other people.

Brown regularly works as a public speaker at private events and businesses, such as at Alain de Botton's School of Life and at Google and Disney.

Writing 
She is, as of 2021, the author of six number-one New York Times bestsellers: The Gifts of Imperfection, Daring Greatly, Rising Strong, Braving the Wilderness, Dare to Lead, and Atlas of the Heart. She discussed Daring Greatly with Oprah Winfrey on Super Soul Sunday in March 2013. The book's title comes from a 1910 Theodore Roosevelt speech, "Citizenship in a Republic", given at the Sorbonne. Her most recent work, Atlas of the Heart, was published in November 2021, with the goal of helping readers expand their emotional vocabulary—the language they have to communicate their feelings.

Brown wrote a chapter of advice in Tim Ferriss' book Tools of Titans. With Tarana Burke, she co-created You Are Your Best Thing: Vulnerability, Shame Resilience, and the Black Experience, an anthology of essays by Black individuals discussing the trauma of white supremacy as well as the experiences of Black love and Black life.

Podcasting 
In 2020, Brown began hosting the Unlocking Us and Dare to Lead podcasts. Unlocking Us alternates between interviews with guests and solo episodes where Brown talks alone, directly to listeners. In solo episodes, she tells stories from her life, explains learnings from her research, and supplements it with summaries of other related social science work. Interview guests have included grief expert David Kessler, singer Alicia Keys, writer Glennon Doyle, and activist Tarana Burke who started the Me Too movement.

In 2022, Brown's interview with Debbie Millman was featured on the Storybound season 5 premiere.

Other work 
Brown is CEO of "The Daring Way", a professional training and certification program on the topics of vulnerability, courage, shame, and empathy. She appeared as herself in the movie Wine Country. Her five-part docuseries, Brené Brown: Atlas of the Heart, was released on HBO Max in 2022.

Personal life 
Brown and her husband, Dr. Steve Alley, have two children. The family lives in Houston, Texas.

Though she was baptized in the Episcopal Church, her family raised her as a Catholic. She later left the Catholic Church and returned to the Episcopal community with her husband and children two decades later.

During her time in higher education, Brown has described addiction to a combination of alcohol, smoking, emotional eating and an addiction to control. Brown stopped drinking and smoking on May 12, 1996, one day after her master's program graduation. She has been sober since then and often talks about the positive impact of that on her life.

Selected works 
 "Feminist Standpoint Theory" and "Shame Resilience Theory." In S. P. Robbins, P. Chatterjee & E. R. Canda (Eds.), Contemporary human behavior theory: A Critical Perspective for Social Work. Boston: Allyn and Bacon. 560 pp.  Published 2007.
 I Thought It Was Just Me (But It Isn't): Telling the Truth About Perfectionism, Inadequacy and Power. Avery. 336 pp.  (2007)
 Connections: A 12-Session Psychoeducational Shame-Resilience Curriculum. Center City, MN: Hazelden.  (2009)
 The Gifts of Imperfection: Let Go of Who You Think You're Supposed to Be and Embrace Who You Are. Center City, MN: Hazelden. 160 pp.  (2010)
 Daring Greatly: How the Courage to Be Vulnerable Transforms the Way We Live, Love, Parent and Lead. New York City: Gotham. 320 pp.  (2012)
 Rising Strong: The Reckoning, the Rumble, the Revolution. Spiegel & Grau, now Random House. 352 pp.  (2015)
 Braving the Wilderness: The Quest for True Belonging and the Courage to Stand Alone. Random House. 208 pp.  (2017)
 Dare to Lead: Brave Work. Tough Conversations. Whole Hearts. Random House. 320 pp.  (2018)
 The Gifts of Imperfection (10th Anniversary Edition). 256 pp.  (2020)
 Atlas of the Heart. Random House. 336pp.  (2021)

Honors and awards
In 2009 Houston Woman Magazine voted Brown one of the city's most influential women. She has also received teaching awards, including the Graduate College of Social Work's Outstanding Faculty Award. In 2016 the Huffington Foundation pledged $2 million over four years to endow a research chair in her name at the Graduate College of Social Work, where she guides the training of social work students in grounded theory methodology and in her research into vulnerability, courage, shame, and empathy. In 2022, her book Atlas of the Heart won the Goodreads Choice award for Best Nonfiction.

References

External links 

 
 Brené Brown's TED Talk on The Power of Vulnerability.
 

1965 births
21st-century American Episcopalians
21st-century American non-fiction writers
21st-century American women writers
Academics from Houston
American motivational writers
American women non-fiction writers
Anglican scholars
Christians from Texas
Living people
People from Harris County, Texas
University of Houston alumni
University of Houston faculty
University of Texas at Austin School of Social Work alumni
Writers from San Antonio
Women motivational writers
American women academics